Baby fever is a strong sudden desire for someone to have their own child. This applies to many cultures and may differ depending on the person.  This is not applicable to anyone, but is more common for women.

Theories

Byproduct view 
This theory predicts that people have basic drives (sex drive and nurturance instinct) that makes sure that reproduction occurs without the desire to have children per se. This view rejects baby fever as a side effect. Instead, this theory gives importance to sexual desire and desire for nurturance of a baby that resulted from the first desire.  

This theory does not deny that reproduction is controlled by some people, but these are seen as results of deliberative choices that surpass the normal situation.

Strong Point 
This theory is consistent with reproductive behaviors of almost all other plant and animal species, and a historical lineage that can be traced back to Malthus.  

This points out that if baby fever is indeed a real emotion, then it would be considered misplaced feelings of wanting to nurture a child, which may be brought about due to absence of a person's own baby.

Weak Points 
Baby fever should not be present in males and females who did not have a child of their own.

Baby fever should center about wanting to nurture a child rather than wanting to have a child of his/her own.

An example of nurturance that is adaptive rather than misplaced, is associated with children of close kin.

Sociocultural view 
This theory focuses on the socialization processes as origin of feelings that men and women have towards babies. The cultural socialization forces gender roles and norms on women.

Examples of these are:  it is a woman's obligation to have children, that a woman will only be fulfilled if she has a child, and that it is her proper place to raise children.

This view states that societies that teach these beliefs convince women to have children. Meanwhile, societies that do not educate these beliefs or oppose them, convince women not to have children.

Strong Points 
This theory accommodates the variety of individual differences regarding baby fever, including emotions about sexuality and reproduction. The variations in culture may be used to explain why people prefer to have or not to have a child.

Weak Points 
The acceptance of female gender roles affects the severity and frequency of baby fever. If people do not follow gender roles, baby fever and sex differences will lessen.

Adaptationist view 
This theory states that baby fever is like an emotional signal telling a person's brain that it is the right time to have a child.  

When people are exposed to positive experiences with babies, such as babies smiling, people like the idea of having kids. Meanwhile, negative experiences (e.g., stinky and crying babies) tend to make people think the opposite.

The trade-offs in having children were also considered in this view. Examples of these trade-offs are: less time, less freedom, and less money.

Weak Points 
Sex differences are supposed to exist in the strength and occurrence of baby fever. This is because of the differences between female and male parental investment.

Gender role should not affect sex differences in baby fever because the emotions are believed to be from cognitive adaptations or hormonal underpinnings.

Baby fever is supposed to increase in certain situations that tells people that it is a good time to have a baby. These situations are: suitable partner, sufficient resources, prior children are not totally dependent, and being fertile or as fertility decreases with age.

Other studies 
Baby fever in men is unrelated to educational and economic status, instead it is related to fertility intentions, marital status, and number of lifetime unions. Men's baby fever is important for proceptive behavior and preparation for fatherhood.

Studies also showed that women's baby fever affects fertility greater than men's baby fever.

References

External links 
 https://www.livescience.com/15949-baby-fever-reproduction.html
 https://www.nbcnews.com/healthmain/baby-fever-real-thing-not-just-women-study-claims-1C6437144
 https://www.vice.com/en/article/xwpvb4/psychology-of-baby-fever-is-it-real

Human reproduction